

The following is a list of mayors of the city of Astrea, Colombia.

See also

List of Governors of the Cesar Department

Notes

External links
 Astrea official website

Astrea, Cesar
Politics of Colombian municipalities
Lists of mayors